Robert Aldersey Vinal (March 6, 1821 – April 12, 1887) was a Massachusetts businessman and politician who served as a member of the Massachusetts House of Representatives and on the Board of Selectmen of Somerville, Massachusetts.

Notes

1821 births
1887 deaths
Republican Party members of the Massachusetts House of Representatives
People from Charlestown, Boston
Politicians from Somerville, Massachusetts
19th-century American politicians